HC Topoľčany is a professional Slovak ice hockey club based in Topoľčany, Slovakia. They play in the Slovak 1. Liga, the second level of ice hockey in the country. The club was founded in 1932.

Honours

Domestic

Slovak 1. Liga
  Runners-up (1): 2004–05
  3rd place (2): 2001–02, 2005–06

Club names
 AC Juventus Topoľčany (1932–1939)
 TS Topoľčany (1939–1949, 1964–1990)
 TJ Topoľčany (1949–1964)
 HC VTJ Topoľčany (1993–2006)
 HC Topoľčany (1990–1993, 2006–present)

References

External links
 Official website (Slovak)
 

Topoľčany
Ice hockey clubs established in 1932
1932 establishments in Slovakia